Kerala Blasters Women's Football Club, commonly referred to as The Blasters, is an Indian women's football club based in Kochi, Kerala, that competes in the Kerala Women's League, the second tier league of women's football in India. Founded in July 2022, the club is affiliated with their men's team Kerala Blasters FC in the Indian Super League.

History

Formation 
On 1 June 2022, the Kerala Blasters announced the appointment of Rajah Rizwan as the director of the club's academy and the newly planned women's team. Later on 25 July, Kerala Blasters officially launched their women's team and announced their participation in the 2022–23 Kerala Women's League season. Shereef Khan was appointed as the first ever head coach of the team on a long-term contract.

Inaugural season 
Kerala Blasters played their first ever match on 10 August 2022 against Emirates Soccer Club at the Maharajas Ground and won the match 10–0 after Apurna Narzary completed a hat-trick with Kiran and Ashwathi completing their respective braces. They  won the next match 10–0 against SB FA Poovar on 12 August in which Sivisha completed her hat-trick and Gadha and Nidhiya completed their respective braces. The Blasters played their next match on 16 August against Lords FA Kochi which ended in a 4–4 draw. On 2 September, the Blasters defeated Kadathanad Raja FA by 13–1. Laxmi scored four goals and Malavika completed her hat-trick by coming in as a substitute. On 11 September, they won 9–0 against Kerala United FC. On 18 September, they played against Basco FC and won 3–2 at full-time and retain their first place in the league table. The Blasters won their match against Luca SC on 2 October, which they won 4–0 after Apurna, who came back from an injury completed her brace. On 13 October, in their final league game, the Blasters suffered their first ever defeat in their history against Gokulam Kerala FC, where they lost 2–6.  At the end of regular season, both Kerala Blasters and Lords FA finished with 22 points each having won seven, drawn one and lost one. However the Blasters were placed third in the league table behind Lords FA by virtue of goal difference and failed to advance to the final.

Players

First-team squad

Personnel

Current technical staff

{| class="wikitable"
|-
! scope="col"|Role
! scope="col"|Name
! scope="col"|
|-
|Director 
| Rajah Rizwan
|
|-
|-
| Head Coach
| Shereef Khan AV
|
|-
|Assistant Coach
| Aswini
|
|-
|Assistant Team Manager
| Nisha
|
|-
|Goalkeeping Coach
| Saji Joy
|
|-
|Physiotherapist
| Priyanka
|

References

External links

 

Kerala Blasters FC Women
Women's football clubs in India
Football clubs in Kerala
Football clubs in Kochi
Association football clubs established in 2022
2022 establishments in Kerala